Ann Hodgman (born 1956) is an American author of more than forty children's books as well as several cookbooks and humor books and many magazine articles.

Biography 
Ann Hodgman was raised in Rochester, New York and graduated from Harvard University in 1978. At Harvard, she was a staff member on the Harvard Lampoon and the Harvard Advocate. Between 1978 and 1984, she lived in New York City and worked as a children's book editor for Bantam Books. She and her husband, author David Owen, moved to Washington, Connecticut and in 1988, she had a son.

Work
Hodgman's Beat That! Cookbook (1995), was considered one of the funniest cookbooks the Library Journal had reviewed. How To Die of Embarrassment Every Day (2011) is a children's book and also a memoir of her life up to the sixth grade.

References

External links

Ann Hodgman's Website 
 

Ann Hodgman at Fantastic Fiction

American children's writers
1956 births
Living people
The Harvard Lampoon alumni
People from Washington, Connecticut
Writers from Rochester, New York
Harvard Advocate alumni
American women children's writers
20th-century American writers
20th-century American women writers
21st-century American writers
21st-century American women writers
Writers from Connecticut